Gokwe South Rural District Council is the rural district local authority in Gokwe South District. Gokwe South District has two local government arms, Gokwe Town Council created under the Zimbabwe Urban Councils Act, Chapter 29.15 administering Gokwe Urban, and Gokwe RDC created in terms of the Zimbabwe Rural District Councils Act, Chapter 29.13 overseeing the rural Gokwe South District in Zimbabwe.

Operations

Gokwe South RDC comprises 33 rural wards in 5 constituencies; 
 Gokwe 4 wards,
 Sesame 7 wards,
 Kana 8 wards, 
 Mapfungautsi 7 wards,
 Sengwa 7 wards

2013 - 2018 Councillors

Source: Zimbabwe Electoral Commission

2008 - 2013 Councillors

Source: Kubatana Aechive

See also

 Gokwe South District
 Gokwe North RDC 
 Gokwe Town 
 Kwekwe District

References 

Districts of Midlands Province